Hasan ibn Hasan, also known as Hasan al-Muthanna, was an Islamic scholar and theologian. He was a son of Hasan ibn Ali and Khawla bint Manzur. He was a grandson of the fourth caliph Ali and a great-grandson of the Islamic prophet Muhammad.

Life 
His father Hasan ibn Ali ruled briefly as caliph in 661 and was a grandson of the Islamic prophet Muhammad. Hasan's mother Khawla bint Manzur was a daughter of Manzur ibn Zaban, the chieftain of the Banu Fazara.

His mother was Khawla bint Manzur ibn Zaban ibn Sayyar Fazari. Hasan al-Muthanna was present in the Battle of Karbala. Ahmad ibn Ibrahim Hasani, in a tradition quoted from Abu Mikhnaf, he said that his age at that time was nineteen or twenty.

On the day of Ashura, he bravely fought beside Imam Husayn and was injured and was kept as captive. His maternal uncle, Asma' ibn Kharijah Fazari, saved him. He was cured in Kufa; and after recovering, he returned to Medina.

Hasan ibn Hasan's uncle Husayn ibn Ali reportedly offered him to choose either of Husayn's two daughters Sukayna and Fatima, to be his wife.  Hasan, who was too shy to accept, consequently chose Fatima, as she resembled his grandmother Fatima al-Zahra.

Children 
Sayyed Ibn Tawus writes about the merit and nobility of Hasan ibn Hasan and some other children of Imam Hasan: "These are people whose lofty position and merit all Muslims acknowledged".

According to a part of a narration reported from Imam Reza about the continuation of the offspring of Imam Hasan and Imam Husayn, it is inferred that Hasan al-Muthanna had many children and Imam Hasan's offspring continued through him and another brother of his named Zayd. It has been reported in this tradition: "Hasan ibn Ali's offspring continued through two of his sons named Zayd and Hasan. Zayd had a son whose name was Hasan. Also, Hasan al-Muthanna had sons named Abd Allah al-Kamil, Ibrahim al-Ghamr and Hasan al-Muthallath from Fatima bint Husayn; Ja'far and Da'wud from Umm al-Walad; Muhammad from Ramla bint Sa'id ibn Zayd; who continued a third generation of Imam Hasan."

Although genealogically senior, Hasan's descendants never managed to establish serious claims to the imamate (other than Zaydism and Imams of Yemen). Moreover, many later shifted to Sunnism in order to rule Sunni countries or when prompted by Sunni superpowers.

References

Bibliography 

 

Battle of Karbala
Family of Muhammad
7th-century Arabs